Cratonavis (meaning "Craton bird") is an extinct genus of pygostylian avialian from the Early Cretaceous Jiufotang Formation of Liaoning Province, China. The genus contains a single species, C. zhui, known from a complete skeleton.

Discovery and naming 
The holotype specimen, IVPP V31106, was discovered in sediments of the Jiufotang Formation, dated to the Aptian age of the early Cretaceous period, near the Xiaotaizi village, (Jianchang County) of Liaoning Province, northeastern China. This specimen consists of a complete, articulated individual with preserved feathers.

In 2023, Li Zhiheng, Wang Min, Thomas A. Stidham, and Zhou Zhonghe described Cratonavis zhui, a new genus and species of jinguofortisid, based on these fossil remains. The generic name, "Cratonavis", combines a reference to the North China Craton with the Latin word "avis", meaning "bird". The specific name, "zhui", honors the Chinese geologist Zhu Rixiang, who has studied the destruction of the North China Craton.

Classification 
Li et al. (2023) recovered Cratonavis as a non-ornithothoracine pygostylian member of the Jinguofortisidae, as the sister taxon to Chongmingia. Their results are shown in the cladogram below:

References 

Early Cretaceous birds of Asia
Prehistoric avialans
Prehistoric bird genera
Aptian genera
Fossil taxa described in 2023
Jiufotang fauna
Birds described in 2023